Nishinomiya City Central Gymnasium is an arena in Nishinomiya, Hyogo, Japan. It is the home arena of the Nishinomiya Storks of the B.League, Japan's professional basketball league.

References

Basketball venues in Japan
Indoor arenas in Japan
Nishinomiya Storks
Sports venues in Hyōgo Prefecture
Nishinomiya
Sports venues completed in 1965
1965 establishments in Japan